Angulitermes ceylonicus, is a species of small termite of the genus Angulitermes. It is found from Maha Iluppalama area of Sri Lanka. 
Angulitermes ceylonicus has also been found from Nagoda, Kandana of Sri Lanka.

References

External links

Termites
Insects described in 1914